This is a list of lamb and mutton dishes and foods. Lamb and mutton are terms for the meat of domestic sheep (species Ovis aries) at different ages. A sheep in its first year is called a lamb, and its meat is also called lamb. The meat of a juvenile sheep older than one year is hogget; outside North America this is also a term for the living animal.  The meat of an adult sheep is mutton, a term only used for the meat, not the living animal.

Meat from sheep features prominently in several cuisines of the Mediterranean. Lamb and mutton are very popular in Central Asia and in India, where other red meats may be eschewed for religious or economic reasons. It is also very popular in Australia. Barbecued mutton is also a specialty in some areas of the United States (chiefly Owensboro, Kentucky) and Canada.

Lamb dishes

 Abgoosht – Iran
 Alinazik kebab – Turkey
 Aloo gosht – Northern Indian Subcontinent
 Arrosticini – Abruzzo, Central Italy
 Bakhsh - From the cuisine of the Bukharan Jews from Tajikistan and Uzbekistan as well as Afghan Jewry
 Beşbarmaq – Common among Turkic peoples in Central Asia
 Beyti kebab – Turkey
 Biryani – Indian Subcontinent
 Blessed thistle with lamb – Aegean Sea region; popular in both Greece and Turkey.
 Cağ kebabı – Turkey
 Cawl – Wales
 Ćevapi – Common throughout the Balkans
 Chakapuli – Georgia
 Chanakhi – Georgia
 Chegdermeh – Turkmenistan
 Colocasia with lamb – Cyprus
 Colonial goose – New Zealand
 Corn poppy with lamb – Aegean Sea region; popular in both Greece and Turkey.
 Curry – Indian Subcontinent 
 Dalcha – Hyderabad, Southern India
 Devilled kidneys – England
 Dhansak – Indian Subcontinent; originated by the Parsi community.
 Doner kebab – Turkey
 Drob – Romania
 Ema-datshi – Bhutan
 Fahsa – Yemen, also popular in Turkey.
 Fårikål – Norway
 Fenalår – Norway
 Fennel with lamb – Aegean Sea region; popular in both Greece and Turkey.
 Gheimeh – Iran
 Grjúpán – Iceland
 Haneeth – Yemen
 Haggis – Scotland
 Hangikjöt – Iceland
 Instant-boiled mutton – China
 Irani mutton – Iran
 Jalamah – Saudi Arabia
 Jameed – Jordan
 Jingisukan – Hokkaido, Japan. Unique in that it is inspired and named for what Japanese people traditionally suspected Mongolian food to be like.
 Kabsa – Yemen
 Kasha Mangsho – Indian subcontinent  
 Kabuli Palaw – Afghanistan
 Kairi ka do pyaza – Hyderabad, southern India
 Kamounia – North Africa
 Kebab – Various; found throughout the Middle East
 Khorkhog – Mongolia
 Kibbeh nayyeh – a national dish of Lebanon, prepared with raw lamb or beef, fine bulgur and spices
 Kokoretsi – Turkish; found throughout the Balkans and Azerbaijan
 Kol böreği – Turkey
 Kuurdak – Central Asia
 Laal maans – Rajasthan, India
 Lahndi – Afghanistan
 Lamb chop – Various; found around the world.
 Lamb fries – Various; found around the world. In the United States, they are most commonly found in Kentucky.
 Lamb in Chilindrón – Spain
 Lamb's fry – Found in various English-speaking nations; the recipe and definition varies according to locality.
 Lancashire hotpot – Lancashire, northern England.
 Lechazo – Spain
 Lunggoi Katsa – Tibet
 Macon – Scotland
 Mallow with lamb – Aegean Sea region; popular in both Greece and Turkey
 Mandi – Yemen
 Mansaf – Various Arab nations
 Méchoui – North Africa
 Mixiote – Mexico
 Moussaka – Various; found throughout the Balkans and the Middle East
 Murtabak – Arab; found throughout the Islamic world, especially in Islamic Southeast Asia
 Mutton pulao – Indian Subcontinent
 Naan qalia – India
 Navarin – France
 Paomo – China; found in the Shaanxi region
 Pasanda – Indian Subcontinent
 Pieds paquets – France; found in the southeast
 Pinchitos – Spain; found in Andalusia and Extremadura
 Pinnekjøtt – Norway
 Pleşcoi sausages – Romania
 Powsowdie – Scotland
 Qeema – Indian Subcontinent
 Quzi – Iraq.
 Rack of lamb – Various Western nations
 Ribberull – Norway
 Roast lamb with laver sauce – Wales
 Rogan josh – Jammu and Kashmir, India
 Saleeg – Saudi Arabia
 Sajji – Pakistan
 Sarburma – Ukraine; invented by Crimean Tatars
 Scotch broth – Scotland
 Scotch pie – Scotland
 Scouse – Either England or Norway
 Sfiha – Lebanon
 Sha Shingbee – Tibet
 Sheep's trotters – Various
 Shuwaa – Various Arab nations; popular in the Levant
 Shepherd's pie – United Kingdom
 Skerpikjøt – Faroe Islands
 Skilpadjies – South Africa
 Smalahove – Norway
 Sodd – Norway
 Sosatie – South Africa
 Squab pie – prepared with mutton and apples – England
 Stuffed intestines – Lebanon
 Svið – Iceland
 Särä – Finland
 Tavë kosi – Albania
 Tomato bredie – South Africa
 Tripoux – France
 Wazwan – Kashmir

See also

 List of beef dishes
 List of chicken dishes
 List of fish dishes
 List of kebabs
 List of meatball dishes
 List of pork dishes
 List of seafood dishes
 Mutton Renaissance Campaign

References

External links
 

 
Lamb dishes